The Dominy craftsmen were a family made up of American clock, furniture, and watch makers  in East Hampton, New York. Nathaniel Dominy IV, his son, Nathaniel V, and his grandson, Felix Dominy were active from about 1760 to 1840. Works created by the Dominys are in the collections of Winterthur Museum, Garden, and Library. As of 2022, a museum dedicated to the Dominys is under construction in East Hampton.

Family 
Nathaniel Dominy IV (1737–1812) was a woodworker, clockmaker and watch repairman. His son, Nathaniel Dominy V (1770–1852), was a furniture maker and carpenter. Felix Dominy (1800–1868), son of Nathaniel Dominy V, mostly made clocks and repaired watches.

Workshops 
The Dominy home (c. 1765), woodworking shop (1791), and clock shop (c. 1798) sat on Main Street in East Hampton.

The Dominy home was demolished in 1946 and the family shops were moved from their original locations. The shop buildings were most recently located at Mulford Farm.

In 1957, the Winterthur Museum, Garden and Library acquired tools, equipment, furnishings, and fittings from the Dominy shops. Reconstructions of the shops have been on display at Winterthur since 1960. Winterthur curator Charles F. Hummel wrote an influential book on the Dominy craftsmen in 1968.

Museum 
In 2021, it was announced the Dominy family home would be rebuilt on Main Street using architectural specifications from the Historical American Buildings Survey. As of January 2022, the East Hampton Historical Society is in the process of restoring the home and shops for use as a museum.

References 

Families from New York (state)
18th-century woodworkers
19th-century artisans
Collections of the Winterthur Museum, Garden and Library
People from East Hampton (town), New York